The 1975 Copa Perú season, the promotion tournament of Peruvian football.

In this tournament after many qualification rounds, each one of the 24 departments in which Peru is politically divided, qualify a team. Those teams plus de team relegated from First Division on the last year, enter in two more rounds and finally 6 of them qualify for the Final round, staged in Lima (the capital).

This year the tournament was held but no team was promoted to First Division because of a law from Peruvian government (Law # 22555). The champion was awarded with the right to represent Peru in an international tournament for amateur teams. Only 4 teams entered the Final. 

A playoff was necessary as first place was tied.

Finalists teams
The following list shows the teams that qualified for the Final Stage.

Final stage

Final group stage

Round 1

Round 2

Round 3

Title Playoff

External links
  Copa Peru 1975
  Semanario Pasión

Copa Perú seasons
Cop